The Daily Journal is a newspaper printed in Vineland, New Jersey from Monday to Saturday. It is distributed throughout most of Cumberland County in Southern New Jersey. Its main competitors are The Philadelphia Inquirer, the Courier Post and The Press of Atlantic City. The main focus is on communities in and around Vineland and Millville.

History
The first daily paper issued in Vineland, it was established on June 7, 1875, by W.E. Cansdell, 14 years after the founding of Vineland. A part of local history almost from the beginning, the original paper consisted of four pages with a yearly subscription rate of $2.

During the year of The Daily Journal'''s birth, the death of an editor at another local paper, The Vineland Independent, made headlines all over the northeast.

Max Leuchter and his wife, Cecelia Bass Leuchter founded The Vineland Times and merged it with The Vineland Journal in 1942. The Leuchter family sold the paper to The Evening News Association of Detroit in 1973. The Millville Daily was acquired at the same time. Gannett bought The Evening News Association in 1985.The Daily Journal took its current name in 1988 with the merger of the Millville Daily into Vineland Times-Journal''.

Prices
The Journal prices are: $0.75 Monday-Saturday.

References

External links

Official website
Official mobile website
Business History: The Daily Journal

Newspapers published in New Jersey
Vineland, New Jersey
Publications established in 1875
Gannett publications